The Jewish International Connection of New York (JICNY) is a volunteer-driven, community outreach non-profit organization for international Jews in their 20s and 30s who are new to New York City. 

The JICNY's mission is to provide internationals of all denominations a "home" by bringing them together in an environment based on common Jewish heritage, values and spirituality. Its pillars of programming include:
Community integration: professional and personal networking for jobs, apartments, roommates, couples and parenting programs, philanthropy, career counseling
Jewish life: Jewish education, holiday events, cooking classes
Israel programs: sponsored trips

The organization was founded in December 2000 by Jodi Samuel.

See also
Jewish outreach

References

External links
Official website

2000 establishments in New York City
Jewish outreach
Jewish charities based in the United States
Organizations established in 2000
Jewish community organizations
Jews and Judaism in New York City
Organizations based in New York City
Non-profit organizations based in New York City